MAX4 (gene) may refer to:

 Carlactone synthase, an enzyme
 All-trans-10'-apo-beta-carotenal 13,14-cleaving dioxygenase, an enzyme